Chloe Sophia Maxmin (born 1992) is an American Democratic politician and environmental activist who served as the Maine State Senator for District 13. A resident of Nobleboro, she was elected to the Maine House of Representatives in November 2018 and to the Maine Senate in November 2020, defeating incumbent Minority Leader Dana Dow. Maxmin was the first Democrat ever to represent Maine House District 88, the youngest member of the 129th Maine Legislature, and is the youngest female state senator in Maine's history.

Early life and education
Maxmin was born in 1992 and grew up on a venison farm in Nobleboro, Maine. She attended Lincoln Academy. Inspired by a 2005 proposal by Plum Creek Development Company to develop Moosehead Lake in the North Maine Woods, she founded the Lincoln Academy Climate Action Club as a ninth grader.. Her late father Doctor Jim Maxmin was a former CEO of Volvo

The Climate Action Club conducted a massive reusable shopping bag campaign, established a no-idling policy on the Lincoln Academy campus, recycled 4,000 batteries and won a $5,000 national award to install solar panels at the school. In part for her work with the Climate Action Club, Maxmin was featured on the "Communities" episode during Season 3 of Big Ideas for a Small Planet in 2009 and was one of ten national winners of the Gloria Barron Prize for Young Heroes in 2010.

Maxmin graduated from Lincoln Academy in 2010 and attended Harvard University beginning in the fall of 2011. At Harvard, Maxmin led the Community Action Committee and co-founded the Divest Harvard campaign focused on ending the University's endowment relationship with fossil fuel companies. Divest Harvard began with 10 participants in 2012 and grew to almost 70,000 by 2015.

Maxmin was named a Green Hero by Rolling Stone, and received an annual Brower Youth Award, both in 2013. In 2014, the Maine Women's Fund presented her with the 2014 Samantha Smith Award for her youth activism and work toward social change.

Maxmin graduated from Harvard University in 2015 with a degree in social studies and a minor in environmental science and public policy and returned to Maine.

Political career

Maine State House
In February 2018, Maxmin announced her candidacy for District 88 representative to the Maine House of Representatives. In the Democratic primary on June 12, 2018, she defeated Alan Plummer 80%-20%. In the 2018 Maine House of Representatives general election, Maxmin defeated Republican Michael Lemelin 53%-47%, becoming the first Democrat ever to represent House District 88 and the youngest woman in the Maine State Legislature.

Maxmin served as a member of the Joint Standing Committee on Agriculture, Conservation and Forestry in the 129th Maine Legislature. In March 2019, she introduced the “Act to Establish a Green New Deal for Maine”, and on April 16, 2019, the Maine AFL-CIO announced its support for the bill. This was the first time a state AFL-CIO chapter has endorsed a Green New Deal proposal. Although the final bill was significantly smaller than the original (it was pared from five sections down to two), it passed the Maine Legislature in June 2019 and was signed into law by Governor Janet Mills on June 17, 2019.

Maxmin is a graduate of the Emerge Maine candidate training program.

Maine State Senate
On January 13, 2020, Maxmin announced her candidacy for Maine State Senate District 13. She was unopposed in the Democratic primary and received all 5,335 votes cast. In the 2020 Maine State Senate general election, Maxmin defeated incumbent Senate Minority Leader Dana Dow 51%-49% becoming the youngest female state senator in Maine's history.

Rural Runner, a short film about Maxmin's 2020 Maine State Senate race, was released in October 2020.

In January 2021, Maxmin was one of over 70 lawmakers to sign a letter asking the Maine Public Utilities Commission to reinstate a moratorium on power disconnections during the COVID-19 pandemic in Maine.

In February 2021, she was appointed by Senate president Troy Jackson to the Maine Climate Council.

In May 2021 she appeared on Fox News making the claim from her book that Democrats have abandoned rural America

Electoral history

2018 Maine House District 88

2020 Maine State Senate

Works 

 with Canyon Woodward, Dirt Road Revival: How to Rebuild Rural Politics and Why Our Future Depends On It,

References

External links 

Place of birth missing (living people)
Living people
Democratic Party Maine state senators
People from Nobleboro, Maine
Harvard College alumni
21st-century American politicians
Women state legislators in Maine
21st-century American women politicians
1992 births
Lincoln Academy (Maine) alumni